Kun is an Arabic word for the act of "manifesting", "existing" or "being" and consisting of the letters Kaph and Nun (letter). In the Qur'an, Allah commands the universe to "be" ("kun!" ), so that it is (fa-yakūnu ).

Kun fa-yakūnu has its reference in the Quran cited as a symbol or sign of God's mystical creative power. The verse is from the Quranic chapter, Surah Ya-Sin. In context, the words kun fa-yakūnu appear in the 36th Chapter, verse number 82:

The term also appears as part of 117th verse of the 2nd Quranic chapter, Surah Baqara.

There are eight Quranic references to kun fa-yakūnu:

See also 
 Be, and it is

External links 
Quick or Slow Creation - The Implication of "Kun Fayakun"
The phrase “Kun fayakun” in Qur’an Majeed

Arabic words and phrases
Islamic terminology